José Antônio Rabelo de Andrade (born 1 January 1964), known as Toninho Andrade, is a Brazilian football manager, currently in charge of Portuguesa da Ilha.

Competitions history

Honours

References

1964 births
Living people
Sportspeople from Rio de Janeiro (city)
Brazilian football managers
Campeonato Brasileiro Série B managers
Campeonato Brasileiro Série C managers
Campeonato Brasileiro Série D managers
Associação Atlética Portuguesa (RJ) managers
Macaé Esporte Futebol Clube managers
Ituano FC managers
Olaria Atlético Clube managers
Americano Futebol Clube managers
Rio Branco Atlético Clube managers
Associação Desportiva Cabofriense managers
Volta Redonda Futebol Clube managers
Madureira Esporte Clube managers
Bonsucesso Futebol Clube managers
Resende Futebol Clube managers